Lotus corniculatus is a flowering plant in the pea family Fabaceae, native to grasslands in temperate Eurasia and North Africa. Common names include common bird's-foot trefoil, eggs and bacon, birdsfoot deervetch, and just bird's-foot trefoil, though the latter name is often also applied to other members of the genus.

It is a perennial herbaceous plant, similar in appearance to some clovers. The name 'bird's foot' refers to the appearance of the seed pods on their stalk. Five leaflets are present, but with the central three held conspicuously above the others, hence the use of the name 'trefoil'. It is often used as forage and is widely used as food for livestock due to its nonbloating properties.

Description
It is typically sprawling at the height of the surrounding grassland. It can survive fairly close grazing, trampling, and mowing. It is most often found in sandy soils. It flowers from June to September. The flowers develop into small pea-like pods or legumes.

The plant had many common English names in Britain, which are now mostly out of use. These names were often connected with the yellow and orange colour of the flowers, e.g. 'butter and eggs'. One name that is still used is eggs and bacon (or bacon and eggs).

Subtaxa
The following subspecies are accepted:
Lotus corniculatus subsp. afghanicus 
Lotus corniculatus subsp. corniculatus
Lotus corniculatus subsp. delortii 
Lotus corniculatus subsp. fruticosus 
Lotus corniculatus subsp. preslii

Distribution and habitat
Lotus corniculatus has a broad distribution worldwide. It is common everywhere in Britain and Ireland. Habitats include old fields, grassy places, and roadsides.

Uses
It is used in agriculture as a forage plant, grown for pasture, hay, and silage. It is a high quality forage that does not cause bloat in ruminants. Taller-growing cultivars have been developed for this. It may be used as an alternative to alfalfa in poor soils.

A double-flowered variety is grown as an ornamental plant. It is regularly included as a component of wildflower mixes in Europe. It can also prevent soil erosion and provide a good habitat for wildlife.

Fresh bird's-foot trefoil contains cyanogenic glycosides, which release small amounts of hydrogen cyanide when macerated. This is not normally poisonous to humans, though, as the dose is very low, and the metabolization of cyanide is relatively quick. Condensed tannins are also present in L. corniculatus.

In the traditional medicine of the Sannio regio of Italy, the diluted infusions were used for anxiety, insomnia, and exhaustion.

Ecology
The flowers are mostly visited by bumblebees. In the Chicago Region, mostly non-native bees have been observed visiting the flowers, including Andrena wilkella, Anthidium oblongatum, Apis mellifera and Megachile rotundata. The native bees Bombus impatiens and Megachile relativa have also been observed visiting birdsfoot trefoil flowers, though the latter only rarely.

The plant is an important nectar source for many insects and is also used as a larval food plant by many species of Lepidoptera such as six-spot burnet and the silver-studded blue. It is a host plant for the wood white butterfly, Leptidea sinapis.

Invasive species
Birdsfoot trefoil is an invasive species in many parts of North America and Australia. It has been commonly planted along roadsides for erosion control or pastures for forage and then spreads into natural areas. Once it has established in an area, it can outcompete native species. The use of prescribed fire is not an effective management tool against Lotus corniculatus and herbicide is recommended instead to control it.

Gallery

References

External links

Jones, D.A. and Turkington, R., 1986. Biological flora of the British Isles: Lotus corniculatus. Journal of Ecology 74, pp.1185-1212.
Jepson manual Treatment
Photo gallery

corniculatus
Plants described in 1753
Taxa named by Carl Linnaeus